Edward Peter Carville (May 14, 1885 – June 27, 1956) was an American politician. He was the 18th Governor of Nevada and a Senator from Nevada. He was a member of the Democratic Party.

Biography
Carville was born on May 14, 1885, at Mound Valley in Elko County, Nevada. He graduated with a law degree from the University of Notre Dame in Notre Dame, Indiana in 1909. Admitted to the bar in the same year, he established his practice in Elko, Nevada. He married Irma Marie Callahan on August 29, 1910 and they had three sons, Edward, Richard, and Robert.

Career
Carville was appointed to the position of deputy district attorney and served from 1910 to 1911. He was district attorney for Elko County from 1912 to 1918. He was a district judge of Elko County in 1928. He was a United States Attorney for Nevada between 1934 and 1938.

Carville became the Governor of Nevada in 1939 and, reelected in 1942, he served there until his resignation in 1945. During his tenure, World War II, government, and economic issues were addressed.

He was appointed on July 24, 1945 to the United States Senate to fill the vacancy caused by the death of James G. Scrugham and served from July 25, 1945 to January 3, 1947. He was an unsuccessful candidate for renomination in 1946 and resumed his practice of law in Reno, Nevada.

Death
Carville died on June 27, 1956, at the age of 71. He is interred at Our Mother of Sorrows Cemetery, Reno, Washoe County, Nevada.

References

External links
 
 
National Governors Association
The Political Graveyard
Nevada's First Ladies 

1885 births
1956 deaths
District attorneys in Nevada
Democratic Party governors of Nevada
People from Elko County, Nevada
Democratic Party United States senators from Nevada
Notre Dame Law School alumni
20th-century American politicians
United States Attorneys for the District of Nevada
Catholics from Nevada